Ursul may refer to:

Ursul or Urs, a tributary of the river Țibău in Romania
Ursul (Russia), a tributary of the Katun in Altai Republic, Russia

See also 
 Ursu River (disambiguation)